The Habichtwand is a rock formation located in the city of Bad Oeynhausen and the district of Minden-Lübbecke within the German state of North Rhine-Westphalia, not far from the city of Minden. The rock is located in the Wiehen Hills. The meaning of the German term "Habichtswand" is "Wall of the Northern Goshawk".

Rock formations of North Rhine-Westphalia
Minden-Lübbecke